South Ham is a district and ward of Basingstoke, to the west of the town centre.

It takes its name from South Ham Farm, which was once the major farm in the area but was demolished in the early 1960s. Parts of the area were developed for Council Housing in both the 1930s and 1950s when Western Way, one of the principal roads was built. The majority of development took place in the late 1960s, when Basingstoke was developed as an overspill town for London. South Ham has a number of roads named after royalty, authors and saints.

South Ham has four schools (Aldworth School, Park View Infants and Juniors, St. Anne's Catholic Primary School and Bishop Challoner Catholic Secondary School), a library, a dental practice and surgery and several churches. In 2020, Hampshire County Council announced plans to close South Ham library.

References

External links
Basingstoke and Deane Council

Areas of Basingstoke